RFA Surf Patrol (A357) was a Surf-class freighting tanker of the Royal Fleet Auxiliary. She and her sister RFA Surf Pioneer were originally ordered by Polish owners but were commandeered by the Admiralty whilst under construction during the Korean War. Surf Patrol was at the time being built as the Tatry for the Polish Government.

Surf Patrol was decommissioned on 11 May 1961 and laid up at Devonport. She was sold back into commercial service in December 1969 and was renamed Marisurf for D.J. Chandris.

Surf-class tankers
Tankers of the Royal Fleet Auxiliary
1951 ships